Palle Bruun (26 April 1938 – 20 October 1984) was a Danish footballer. He played in two matches for the Denmark national football team in 1963.

References

External links
 
 

1938 births
1984 deaths
Danish men's footballers
Denmark international footballers
Footballers from Odense
Association football forwards
Boldklubben 1913 players
Esbjerg fB players